Seberang Perai is a city in the Malaysian state of Penang. It is situated on the Malay Peninsula opposite Penang Island, bordering Kedah to the north and east and Perak to the south. Its city centre is located in Butterworth, while its local authority, the Seberang Perai City Council, is centred near Bukit Mertajam. , Seberang Perai had a population of 946,000, making it the third most populous city in Malaysia.

Originally a part of Kedah, the territory containing the present-day city was ceded to the British East India Company in 1800. The British acquired Province Wellesley, as they subsequently named it, to provide more agricultural land and as a defensive bulwark against any cross-strait invasion of Penang Island from the mainland. Since then, it has become part of Penang, which was made a British crown colony in 1867.

Seberang Perai has witnessed substantial economic development in the decades after Malaya's independence. Massive industrial estates have been established within Seberang Perai, while the relocation of the Port of Penang's core operations to Butterworth in 1974 has also boosted the city's economy. Improvements in connectivity and transportation were facilitated by several major projects, such as the constructions of the North–South Expressway, the Penang Bridge and the Second Penang Bridge. Today, Seberang Perai forms part of Greater Penang, the second largest conurbation in Malaysia.

Etymology 
Seberang Perai was originally named Province Wellesley after Richard Wellesley, 1st Marquess Wellesley, who served as the Governor of Madras and Governor-General of Bengal between 1797 and 1805.

The term 'Seberang Perai' was believed to be derived from a local phrase used to refer to the northern banks of the Perai River. The name of Perai originated from the Thai word, plāi, which meant the end. When Province Wellesley was acquired by the British East India Company in 1800, the Perai River served as the original boundary between British Province Wellesley and the Siamese-influenced Kedah to the north. Hence, the locals called the northern banks of the river Seberang Perai, in reference to the Siamese territory across the river.

History

Early history 
Earliest records of the history of Seberang Perai can be traced back to the prehistoric times with evidence of human settlement in Guar Kepah to the south of the Muda River about 5,000 to 6,000 years ago. Seberang Perai is located between two main important archaeological sites, Bujang Valley and Sungai Selinsing. Human remains, seashells and other artefacts have been found at the site, indicating the settlement of the area during the Neolithic era.

Seberang Perai was also part of the Bujang Valley civilisation. The Cherok Tok Kun megalith in Bukit Mertajam, discovered in 1845, contains Pali inscriptions, implying that an early Hindu-Buddhist political entity in what is now Kedah had established control over parts of Seberang Perai sometime between the 5th and 6th centuries.

Henceforth, for much of Seberang Perai's history, the area formed part of Kedah. It was only with the advent of British colonialism in the 18th century that the modern history of Seberang Perai would begin.

British acquisitions 

In 1786, Francis Light of the British East India Company had landed on Penang Island, which at the time was also part of Kedah. After brokering an agreement with the then Sultan of Kedah, Sultan Abdullah Mukarram Shah, regarding the cession of Penang Island to the British East India Company, Light returned to the island on 11 August that year and claimed it "in the name of His Britannic Majesty, King George III".

However, the British East India Company was slow to realise the importance of the hinterland across the Penang Strait from Penang Island (then named the Prince of Wales Island). Merchant vessels traversing the Penang Strait were often threatened by pirates originating from the Perai River. In addition, Kedah was being invaded by Siam and Sultan Abdullah, disgruntled by the lack of military aid as promised by Light, assembled his army in Seberang Perai in 1790 to retake the Prince of Wales Island. The planned amphibious assault was thwarted by the British East India Company, which launched night attacks on Kedah's forts.

On 7 July 1800, the first Lieutenant-Governor of the Prince of Wales Island, Sir George Leith, gained a  strip of Seberang Perai from the new Sultan of Kedah, Dziaddin Mukarram Shah II. The treaty, negotiated by Leith's First Assistant George Caunter, superseded Light's earlier agreement and gave the British permanent sovereignty over both Prince of Wales Island and the newly ceded mainland territory, which in subsequent years was named Province Wellesley. The acquired land included a five-kilometre stretch of coastline south of the Perai River, which became the international border between Province Wellesley and Kedah. At the time, Province Wellesley was heavily forested and sparsely populated, with a total population of only 5,000.

Province Wellesley was subsequently expanded thrice. Following the Siamese conquest of Kedah in 1821, the British and the Siamese agreed in 1831 to demarcate the southernmost Siamese border with Province Wellesley along the Muda River; the British in effect enlarged Province Wellesley to include the area between the Muda River to the north and the Perai River to the south. Province Wellesley's eastern boundaries with Siam was also delineated following another treaty in 1859. The final change to Penang's boundaries was made in 1874 following the Pangkor Treaty between the British Empire and Perak, which included a clause on the demarcation of the Province Wellesley-Perak border south of the Kerian River. Penang's borders have remained unchanged since then.

British rule 

Ever since the British acquisition of Province Wellesley in 1800, the strip of hinterland has been part of the Settlement (and now the State) of Penang. The acquisition of Province Wellesley gave the British East India Company full control of the Penang Strait, as well as an agricultural hinterland and a buffer zone to protect the Prince of Wales Island from any cross-strait military invasion. it also allowed the British to suppress the pirates at the mouth of the Perai River.

In 1826, both Province Wellesley and the Prince of Wales Island, along with Singapore and Malacca, were amalgamated into the Straits Settlements, with George Town on the island made as the capital. However, the capital of the Straits Settlements was then relocated to Singapore in 1832. The Straits Settlements was later made a British crown colony under the direct governance of the Colonial Office in London in 1867. As a British crown colony, Province Wellesley was administered by a district officer directly under the Lieutenant-Governor (later Resident Councillor) of Penang, who in turn was subordinate to the Governor of the Straits Settlements based in Singapore.

Meanwhile, Province Wellesley continued to witness continuing growth under the British. With its population increasing due to the influx of Malay refugees from Siamese-occupied Kedah, Province Wellesley became the rice bowl of Penang. Other than rice and vegetables, other cash crops, such as sugar, coconut and tapioca, were also cultivated in Province Wellesley. Due to the abundance of land in Province Wellesley, it became the only area in Penang where rubber and palm oil estates were established as well.

Other than agriculture, Province Wellesley also began to serve as Penang's transportation hub, a role it continues to play to this day. Butterworth, directly opposite George Town across the Penang Strait, was developed in the mid-19th century to serve Penang's logistical needs. Ferry services were established between Butterworth and George Town towards the end of the 19th century; these became the predecessor to the present-day Rapid Ferry. When the pan-Malayan railway was extended into Province Wellesley in the 1900s, both Butterworth and Bukit Mertajam further inland also became important rail termini, leading to the construction of the Butterworth and Bukit Mertajam train stations.

The growth of Butterworth and Bukit Mertajam also convinced the British colonial authorities to establish and regulate local governments in Province Wellesley. In 1913, four local boards were set up within Province Wellesley - three rural district boards for the Northern, Central and Southern districts, as well as the Butterworth Town Board. These local boards were upgraded into local councils in 1952; the Bukit Mertajam Town Council was also established in the following year.

World War II 
During the early days of the Japanese invasion of Malaya in December 1941, the Royal Air Force and the Royal Australian Air Force units stationed at RAF Butterworth struggled to counter Japanese air raids over Penang and took heavy casualties. With RAF Butterworth itself heavily damaged, these Allied units had to withdraw southwards by 15 December.

The Imperial Japanese Army subsequently invaded Province Wellesley from the north, with the 25th Army capturing RAF Butterworth  on 20 December 1941. As with Penang Island, the period of Japanese occupation brought much hardship to civilians in Province Wellesley; especially notorious was the Sook Ching massacres implemented against the Chinese populace.

Province Wellesley was liberated by the British in September 1945 and was placed under military administration for one year.

Post-war era 

In 1946, the Straits Settlements was abolished, and the now separate Crown Colony of Penang was to be merged into the Malayan Union. The Malayan Union was subsequently replaced by the Federation of Malaya in 1948 and full independence was granted in 1957.

After Malaya gained independence in 1957, Province Wellesley was renamed Seberang Perai. The Butterworth and Bukit Mertajam town councils were merged into the surrounding rural district councils in 1961, and between 1973 and 1976, the remaining three rural district councils were amalgamated into the Seberang Perai Municipal Council. On 16 September 2019, Malaysia Day, Seberang Perai became a full city of its own. Following this latest amalgamation of the local councils, all of Seberang Perai are administered under a single local government, making the Seberang Perai City Council the biggest local government in Malaysia in terms of land size.

In the decades that followed, the Penang state government opened massive industrial estates in Seberang Perai, such as in Perai, Mak Mandin, Bukit Mertajam and Nibong Tebal. In addition, the Port of Penang, which had been located in George Town, was shifted to Butterworth in 1974. The completion of the North-South Expressway, the Penang Bridge and the Second Penang Bridge by the Malaysian federal government, along with several state-built expressways such as the Butterworth Outer Ring Road, has improved connectivity between the towns in Seberang Perai and with Penang Island.

These developments have boosted the economy of Seberang Perai and led to the rapid urbanisation of the city and its townships. These have also been complemented by the growth of new residential townships, such as Seberang Jaya and Juru. In recent years, Batu Kawan, where the mainland end of the Second Penang Bridge is located, has emerged as a new growth centre, spurred by a number of major projects and millions of investment funds being poured into the town.

Geography 
Seberang Perai refers to the mainland portion of the State of Penang. It is physically separated from Penang Island to the west by the Penang Strait. To its north, the Muda River forms the Penang-Kedah border, while a short section of the Kerian River marks the southern boundary between Penang and Kedah. Seberang Perai is mostly flat. The hill is considered a prominent landmark, as it can be seen from Penang Island; conversely, one can view Penang Island from its peak.

The rivers and coastline of Seberang Perai are lined with mangrove swamps. Examples of the mangrove forests include the mouth of the Perai River and the Muda River basin.

Outlying islets 
Two offshore islets, Aman and Gedung islands, are situated off the southern coast of Seberang Perai, within the South Seberang Perai District. Of the two islets, only Aman Island is sparsely populated.

Urban and suburban areas 

Other major places in Seberang Perai include Bukit Mertajam, Perai, Simpang Ampat, Nibong Tebal and Batu Kawan.

Drainage system 
The major rivers in Seberang Perai include the Muda River, Perai River and Kerian River. Of all the rivers in Seberang Perai, the Muda River, which forms the northern border with Kedah, is arguably the most vital; Penang obtains up to 80% of its water supply from this river alone. Thus, illegal logging activities that have been carried out upstream in Kedah have periodically generated concerns about Penang's water supply.

Climate 
Like the rest of Malaysia, Seberang Perai has a tropical rainforest climate under the Köppen climate classification (Af), although it also borders on a tropical monsoon climate. Seberang Perai does experience slightly drier conditions between December and February of the following year.

Penang's proximity to the island of Sumatra, Indonesia makes it susceptible to dust particles carried by wind from the perennial but transient forest fires, creating a yearly phenomenon known as the Southeast Asian haze. The haze season typically occurs between July and October.

Weather forecasts for Seberang Perai is served by the Bayan Lepas Regional Meteorological Office on Penang Island, which acts as the primary weather forecast facility for northern Peninsular Malaysia.

Government and politics

Local government 

Local administration of Seberang Perai is under the purview of the Seberang Perai City Council, an agency of the Penang state government. Headquartered near Bukit Mertajam, the city council is responsible for urban planning, heritage preservation, public health, sanitation, waste management, traffic management, environmental protection, building control, social and economic development, and general maintenance of urban infrastructure.

The Mayor is appointed by the Penang state government for two years, while each of the 24 councillors is appointed for a one-year term. The current President of the Seberang Perai City Council is Rozali Mohamud, who took office in 2017.

Districts 

Seberang Perai is also divided into three administrative districts - North, Central and South. Each district contains a lands and district office headed by a district officer. The lands and district office deals with land administration and revenue; thus it differs from the city council, which oversees the provision and maintenance of urban infrastructure.

State and federal constituencies 

For the unicameral Penang State Legislative Assembly, Seberang Perai is divided into 21 state constituencies, more than half of the 40 seats in the entire state. The State Assemblymen are elected into office via Penang-level election, which by convention is held simultaneously with the Malaysian General Election every five years.

Penang Island is also represented by seven Members of Parliament in the Parliament of Malaysia. The Members of Parliament are elected via the Malaysian General Election, which is held every five years.

The current State Assemblymen and Members of Parliament for Seberang Perai are as listed below.

Judiciary 
There are three Magistrates Courts within Seberang Perai, one each for every district. The Butterworth Magistrates Court has jurisdiction for the Northern District, the Bukit Mertajam Magistrates Court over the Central District and the Jawi Magistrates Court handles cases within the Southern District.

Demographics 

, Seberang Perai was populated by 946,092 residents, making it the second most populous local government area in Malaysia after the federal capital city, Kuala Lumpur. This also meant that, by 2020, Seberang Perai was home to over 54.36% of Penang's population, slightly outnumbering the population of Penang Island, Malaysia's second largest city.

Most of Seberang Perai's population is concentrated within the Central District, while the Southern District is least populated. This is due to the recent urbanisation of the more industrialised Central District, which includes Perai, Bukit Mertajam, Bukit Tengah and Bukit Minyak, and the district's greater economic activity. On the other hand, the ongoing development of the Southern District, specifically around Batu Kawan, has led to its more rapid population growth rate compared to the Northern and Central districts.

Ethnicities 
, ethnic Malays constituted nearly 49% of Seberang Perai's population, with most Malays being concentrated in the Northern District. The Chinese made up 33% of the population; while most reside within the Central District, the Southern District has a larger proportion of ethnic Chinese. Another 10% of Seberang Perai's population comprised ethnic Indians, the third largest ethnic community.

Economy
While the economy of Seberang Perai has traditionally been driven by agriculture, since the mid-20th century, the city has become heavily industrialised. The first industrial estate was established in Mak Mandin, near Butterworth, in the 1950s under the leadership of the then Chief Minister of Penang, Wong Pow Nee. The relocation of the Port of Penang to Butterworth in 1974 and the completion of several expressways have also boosted the growth of manufacturing as one of the economic mainstays of Seberang Perai, by facilitating the ease of transportation of goods and services.

The resulting rapid urbanisation of Seberang Perai has fueled the city's housing market; in particular, the Central District has benefited the most in terms of newly built housing units due to its greater industrial activity and the location of the Penang Bridge's terminus within the said district.

In recent years, Batu Kawan, within the Southern District, has witnessed massive transformation, with an industrial park, an international technology hub and several other mixed-development projects being planned for the town.

Manufacturing 
The main industrial zones within Seberang Perai are located in Mak Mandin, Perai, Bukit Mertajam and Nibong Tebal. There has been a higher concentration of manufacturing activities within the Central District, which encompasses Perai and Bukit Mertajam, making it the most industrialised district within Seberang Perai.

In particular, several multinational corporations and Malaysian manufacturing giants, including Honeywell Aerospace, Sony, Mattel, Pensonic, Chevron and Malayawata Steel are based in Perai, due to its proximity to the Port of Penang. Smaller industries, such as foodstuff and textiles, are concentrated in inland areas like Mak Mandin and Nibong Tebal, while Bukit Tengah near Bukit Mertajam has a significant engineering industry that includes international names like Blaupunkt and Schlumberger.

The Batu Kawan Industrial Park is another upcoming manufacturing zone, attracting multinational companies such as VAT, Bose Corporation, Boston Scientific and Robert Bosch GmbH.

Entrepôt trade 

The Port of Penang was relocated from George Town to Butterworth in 1974, in order to expand its container and cargo services. To date, the Port of Penang operates six cargo and container terminals around Butterworth. This has led to the manufacturing boom in Seberang Perai, as the Port of Penang has facilitated the ease of export from the factories in Perai.

The Port of Penang handled more than 1.44 million TEUs of cargo in 2016, making it the third busiest seaport in Malaysia. The Port's strategic location allowed it to service not just northern Malaysia, but also southern Thailand.

Agriculture 
Seberang Perai has historically served as an agricultural rice bowl for Penang, as the inherent lack of land on Penang Island necessitated the choice of the mainland for plantations and paddy fields. In addition, Bukit Mertajam was once well known as a production centre for rubber, cloves and nutmegs.

However, within the State of Penang, the agricultural sector has been declining. This sector has contributed a mere 2.2% of Penang's GDP , while only 2.7% of Penang's workforce was employed in agriculture-related occupations in the fourth quarter of that year.

Services 
Seberang Perai has also witnessed a growing services sector; while the city is not as well known as Penang Island as a tourist destination of choice, it does have a developing retail scene. Eco-tourism is another sub-sector that has been recently promoted within Seberang Perai, taking advantage of the mangrove forests.

More recently, Batu Kawan has emerged as a potential growth centre for technological services and the shared services outsourcing sub-sector, with the Penang International Technology Park in the works.

Retail 
At the time of writing, among the major shopping malls within Seberang Perai are Megamal Pinang in Perai, Sunway Carnival Mall in Seberang Jaya and The Summit Bukit Mertajam Plaza in Bukit Mertajam. , another shopping mall, GEM Mall in Butterworth, is under construction; it has been touted as the largest shopping mall in northern Malaysia.

In 2016, Design Village, Malaysia's largest outlet mall, was opened in Batu Kawan, offering various international fashion and accessory brands such as Gap, Pierre Cardin, Padini, Adidas and Levi's.

Another famous component of Seberang Perai's retail sub-sector is Juru's Auto-City. An entertainment and retail precinct in Juru, it not only contains several automobile showrooms, but also a varied assortment of retail outlets, eateries and other services. Some of the international names at Juru Auto-City include Audi, Ferrari, Fiat, Porsche, Nando's, Starbucks, Secret Recipe and Subway.

In 2016, IKEA, the world's largest furniture retailer, announced that it will open a store in Batu Kawan by 2018, making it the first IKEA outlet in northern Malaysia.

Transport
Since the latter half of the 20th century, several infrastructural projects have been completed in Seberang Perai, boosting the city's connectivity with Penang Island, as well as the rest of Peninsular Malaysia. Seberang Perai is connected to Penang Island via a ferry service, the Penang Bridge and the Second Penang Bridge, the latter of which is the longest bridge in Southeast Asia. The feasibility of more cross-strait links are being explored at the time of writing.

Malaysia's North–South Expressway, part of Asian Highway 2, runs through Seberang Perai, as is Penang's sole section of inter-state rail track operated by the Malayan Railway.

Land 

The North-South Expressway is the main highway that runs across the more developed western Peninsular Malaysia; the expressway forms part of Asian Highway 2, as it is connected to Thailand's Phet Kasem Road at its northern end and the Singapore Causeway at its southern end. This expressway runs through Seberang Perai, thus connecting major areas, such as Butterworth, Seberang Jaya, Perai, Juru, Batu Kawan and Nibong Tebal, with other cities and towns along western Peninsular Malaysia, southern Thailand and Singapore.

Other major roads and expressways within Seberang Perai include the Butterworth Outer Ring Road (BORR) and the Butterworth–Seberang Jaya Toll Road. The BORR was constructed in the 2000s to alleviate traffic congestion along the North–South Expressway, providing drivers from Butterworth with an alternative route to Perai to the south. The Prai River Bridge was also built for this purpose, traversing the Perai River that separates Butterworth and Perai. In addition, the BORR is linked to the Butterworth–Seberang Jaya Toll Road, which was completed in 2007.

Aside from roads and expressways, rail transportation has historically played a vital role in Seberang Perai's economy. The first railway tracks were laid in the 1900s, connecting the area with the rest of Malaya for the first time, and facilitating the transportation of agricultural and mining commodities for export via the Port of Penang. Out of the six train stations in Seberang Perai, the two major stations are in Butterworth and Bukit Mertajam, with the former offering services by both the Malayan Railway and the State Railway of Thailand; the Butterworth rail station is also one of the major stops of the Eastern and Oriental Express between Bangkok and Singapore. Domestically, the Malayan Railway runs the inter-state Electric Train Service along much of its West Coast Route, allowing train commuters from Penang to travel to Kuala Lumpur in as little as four hours.

The two bridges that connect Seberang Perai with Penang Island are the Penang Bridge and the Second Penang Bridge. The Penang Bridge links Perai and Gelugor, a southern suburb of Penang's capital city, George Town, and was completed in 1985. At the time of its opening, the bridge was the longest in Southeast Asia. In 2013, it was superseded by the -long Second Penang Bridge to the south, which runs between Batu Kawan and Batu Maung near the southeastern tip of Penang Island.

A major transportation hub, Penang Sentral, is being constructed in Butterworth, and the first phase of the project, which consists of an inter-city bus terminal, is slated for completion in 2017. Penang Sentral is strategically located next to the Sultan Abdul Halim Ferry Terminal and the Butterworth rail station. Overall, there are eight phases of the Penang Sentral project, which aims to integrate all bus, rail and ferry services under a single mixed complex that will also incorporate commercial, residential and retail elements, akin to Kuala Lumpur Sentral.

Public transportation 
The ground public transportation needs within Seberang Perai are currently being met by Rapid Penang, the primary public transit bus brand in Penang. At the time of writing, Rapid Penang operates 19 public transit routes within Seberang Perai, three cross-strait BEST shuttle bus services towards Penang Island, and four interstate routes towards neighbouring Kedah and Perak. Most public transit bus routes originate and terminate in Butterworth, linking it with other towns such as Perai, Bukit Mertajam, Nibong Tebal and Simpang Ampat, while other routes operate specifically within each of the three districts of Seberang Perai.

Other than Rapid Penang, the only other public transit bus operator is Cityliner, which handles a handful of routes within Seberang Perai as well.

Sea 
Currently the most vital harbour within northern Malaysia and one of the largest in the country, the Port of Penang now operates the following facilities around Butterworth.
 North Butterworth Container Terminal
 Butterworth Wharves
 Prai Wharves
 Vegetable oil tanker pier
 Bagan Dalam Dockyard
 Prai Bulk Cargo Terminal
The Port of Penang handled more than 1.44 million TEU of cargo in 2010, the third largest cargo volume amongst seaports in Malaysia. The Port's strategic location enabled it to serve not just northern Malaysia, but also southern Thailand.

Rapid Ferry, which links Butterworth and George Town, has been managed by Prasarana Malaysia since 2017. This cross-strait shuttle ferry service commenced operations in 1894, making it the oldest surviving ferry service in Malaysia. At present, six ferries ply the Penang Strait between the Sultan Abdul Halim Ferry Terminal in Butterworth and George Town daily.

Shopping
 AEON Mall Bukit Mertajam
 AEON BiG Seberang Jaya 
 AEON BiG Bukit Minyak
 Aspen Vision City
 Sunway Carnival Mall
 Megamal Pinang, Prai 
 Pearl City Mall
 Design Village Outlet Mall
 IKEA Batu Kawan, Penang
 Tesco Extra Seberang Perai 
 Tesco Bukit Mertajam
 Tesco Kepala Batas
 Tesco Bagan Ajam
 Summit Bukit Mertajam Plaza
 Billion Kota Permai
 Billion Seberang Jaya
 Econsave Jawi
 Econsave Butterworth
 Econsave Chain Ferry

Healthcare
Public hospitals
 Seberang Jaya Hospital (main)
 Bukit Mertajam Hospital
 Sungai Bakap Hospital
 Kepala Batas Hospital

Private hospitals
 KPJ Penang Specialist Hospital
 Bagan Specialist Centre

Sports
 Batu Kawan Stadium
 Penang Golf Resort
 Jalan Betek MBSP Stadium

Education
There are several higher learning institutions located in Seberang Perai but the most prominent are Universiti Sains Malaysia Engineering Campus located in Nibong Tebal; Universiti Teknologi MARA (UiTM) with branches in Penang and Bertam; and Politeknik Seberang Perai (PSP). Both are situated in the town of Permatang Pauh.

Tourism
Penang Bird Park in Seberang Jaya boasts a collection of over 300 species of birds with enormous walk-in aviaries and is the first and largest bird park of its kind in Malaysia. Popular among bird enthusiasts, the park was built in a garden landscaping concept with natural ponds and a vast collection of flora and several other wildlife including mousedeer, giant alaipaima fish, phytons and monitor lizards.

A popular recreational park among locals and outsiders alike, the Bukit Mertajam Recreational Forest in Cherok Tok Kun, Bukit Mertajam is a tropical rain forest reserve sprawls over 37 hectares of hilly terrain including the Mertajam hill. The forest contains indigenous rain forest trees that could be over a hundred years old such as the Meranti Seraya (Shorea curtisii) and Meranti Rambai Daun (Shorea acuminate). For the adventurous hikers, there are numerous jungle trail branching out towards the peak and also accessible by jeep and cycling. Other activities include picnicking, swimming by the waterfall and camping.

A small village of Mengkuang Titi provides homestay programmes for foreign tourists which is the opportunity to live with the local Malay family while experiencing Malay culture and the laid-back lifestyle of rural living. Among the activities during the programme were fruit picking in the orchard, visiting a handicraft centre, Mengkuang-mat-weaving demonstration, a trip cottage industry factories (Malaysian Muffins), bedak sejuk (traditional beauty powder made from rice flour) and soy bean products), visiting the Mengkuang Dam vicinity and the Air Itam Dalam mangrove reserve, a cultural performance, a stroll through a rubber plantation and an oil palm plantation.

Bukit Tambun, a small tranquil fishing village located in the South Seberang Perai district, remains a seafood heaven for local and foreign tourists alike. It consists of seafood restaurants dotting along the river mouth with the dining area hovering over the water, serving local delicacies which are fresh daily catch from the sea.

Pulau Aman is an island off-coast of Bukit Tambun located at the south-east of Penang island. It consists of a quaint Malay fishing village. The island is accessible to the public via ferry boat from the Batu Musang jetty in Batu Kawan. There is an old well, Telaga Emas (Golden Well) located right next to the sea.

One of the highlights in the town of Nibong Tebal include the firefly watching along the river of Sungai Krian. This can be done late in the evening by boat as visitors can have the opportunity to enjoy the dazzling display of fireflies in the mangrove swamp.

In fact one of the major events in Seberang Perai is the St. Anne's Novena and Feast which is held end of July annually at the St. Anne's Church, Bukit Mertajam which attract nearly over 100,000 pilgrims from all over the country and as far as neighbouring countries such as the Philippines, Russia, Singapore and Australia.

Recently, the North Seberang Perai Local Plan 2020 Draft have developed several heritage trails, namely the Archeo-Tourism Trail, Heritage Trail and Beach Recreation Trail. The Archeo-Tourism Trail would cover an old fort at Kota Kuala Muda, an archaeology complex in Sungai Emas, the Langkasuka ruins in Kota Aur, an early archaeology site in Guar Kepah, a candi (temple) in Permatang Pasir, the Merdeka Bridge-cum-fort in Bumbung Lima and a border cornerstone in Ekor Kucing. Besides that, The Heritage Trail would commence from the Butterworth railway station through the Sultan Abdul Halim ferry terminal, a traditional blacksmith shop in Permatang Benuan, the Capal Jago chapal maker's shop in Kepala Batas and terminates at the whispering market in the Kuala Muda fishing village. Aside from that, the Beach Recreation Trail would cover the Pantai Bersih beach, Bagan Ajam beach, Pantai Teluk Molek (Robina Park) beach, Teluk Air Tawar recreation park, Kuala Bekah beach, Pantai Penaga, Sungai Muda sanctuary park, Pantai Kamloon recreation park, Bertam Vision Park, Padang Cempedak recreation park and Air Hitam Dalam recreation park.

Furthermore, the Central Seberang Perai Local Plan 2020 draft would include the upgrade of the Penang Bird Park, the Seberang Jaya Expo, proposals of rural homestay project in Sama Gagah, Pematang Pasir and Kubang Semang, promoting education-based tourism with MICE facilities in Prai and eco-tourism in Mengkuang Dam and Cherok Tok Kun.

Image Gallery

References

External links
 Official website of Seberang Perai City Council in English